Vermont elected its members September 2, 1806.

See also 
 United States House of Representatives elections, 1806 and 1807
 List of United States representatives from Vermont

Notes 

1806
Vermont
United States House of Representatives